Mesolia bipunctella is a moth in the family Crambidae. It was described by Wileman and South in 1918. It is found in Taiwan.

References

Ancylolomiini
Moths described in 1919
Moths of Taiwan